Coleophora thiophaea is a moth of the family Coleophoridae. It is found in south-eastern India (Dindigul, Tamil Nadu).

The wingspan is about 11 mm. The head and thorax are whitish-ochreous. The palpi is ferruginous-yellowish or yellow-whitish. The antennae are stout, ochreous-whitish and the basal joint shortly rough-scaled anteriorly. The abdomen is whitish-ochreous. The forewings are light ochreous-yellow, although deeper and ferruginous-tinged posteriorly. There is an undefined elongate rather dark fuscous patch extending along the termen, suffused anteriorly with yellow-ferruginous. The hindwings are grey, tinged with pale ochreous towards the apex.

References

thiophaea
Moths of Asia